Stempfferia cercene, the cercene epitola, is a butterfly in the family Lycaenidae. It is found in Sierra Leone, Ghana, Nigeria (south and the Cross River loop), Cameroon, the Republic of the Congo, the Central African Republic, Angola, the Democratic Republic of the Congo, Uganda and north-western Tanzania. The habitat consists of forests.

Adult females oviposit on lichens on the bark of twigs and tree trunks. The larvae are attended by ants.

References

External links
Seitz, A. Die Gross-Schmetterlinge der Erde 13: Die Afrikanischen Tagfalter. Plate XIII 65 f

Butterflies described in 1873
Poritiinae
Butterflies of Africa
Taxa named by William Chapman Hewitson